Jonathan Wilson (born July 17, 1987) is an American professional mixed martial artist. A professional since 2013, he has competed for the UFC, Bellator MMA, and Taura MMA, where he was the Light Heavyweight champion.

Background
Born and raised in San Bernardino, California, Wilson began training in MMA with fighter Lorenz Larkin in 2007.

Mixed martial arts career

Early career
Following an outstanding amateur career where he went 9–0, capturing King of the Cage and Xplode Fight Series Amateur Light Heavyweight Championships, Wilson also won his first six fights as a professional Heavyweight before being signed by the Ultimate Fighting Championship.

Ultimate Fighting Championship
Wilson made his promotional debut against Chris Dempsey at UFC Fight Night 73 on August 8, 2015. He won the fight knockout in the first round.

Wilson faced Henrique da Silva at UFC 199 on June 4, 2016. He lost the fight TKO in the second round.

Wilson next faced Ion Cuțelaba at UFC Fight Night 96 on October 1, 2016. He lost the fight via unanimous decision.

Wilson faced Oskar Piechota in a middleweight bout on October 21, 2017 at UFC Fight Night: Cowboy vs. Till. He lost the fight via unanimous decision.

On August 12, 2019, it was reported that Wilson was released from UFC.

Post-UFC career
After the release, Wilson faced Derek Eason at Gladiator Challenge: Holiday Beatings on December 14, 2019. He won the fight via first-round submission.

Taura MMA
Wilson next challenged Richardson Moreira for the Taura Light Heavyweight Championship at Taura MMA 11 on October 30, 2020. He won the fight and claimed the championship via unanimous decision.

Bellator MMA

Wilson announced that he was signing a multi-fight contract with Bellator and faced Jose Augusto in a Light heavyweight bout on April 2, 2021 at Bellator 255. He lost the bout in the first round via arm triangle choke.

Mixed martial arts record

|-
|Loss
|align=center|9–4
|Jose Augusto
|Submission (arm-triangle choke)
|Bellator 255
|
|align=center|1
|align=center|4:58
|Uncasville, Connecticut, United States
|
|-
|Win
|align=center|9–3
|Richardson Moreira
|Decision (unanimous)
|Taura MMA 11
|
|align=center|5
|align=center|5:00
|Kissimmee, Florida, United States
|
|-
|Win
|align=center|8–3
|Derek Eason
|Submission (armbar)
|Gladiator Challenge: Holiday Beatings
|
|align=center|1
|align=center|1:47
|Hemet, California, United States
|
|-
|Loss
|align=center|7–3
|Oskar Piechota
|Decision (unanimous)
|UFC Fight Night: Cowboy vs. Till
|
|align=center|3
|align=center|5:00
|Gdańsk, Poland
|
|-
|Loss
|align=center|7–2
|Ion Cuțelaba
|Decision (unanimous)
|UFC Fight Night: Lineker vs. Dodson
|
|align=center|3
|align=center|5:00
|Portland, Oregon, United States
|
|-
|Loss
|align=center|7–1
|Henrique da Silva
|TKO (punches)
|UFC 199
|
|align=center|2
|align=center|4:11
|Inglewood, California, United States
|
|-
|Win
|align=center|7–0
|Chris Dempsey
|KO (punches)
|UFC Fight Night: Teixeira vs. Saint Preux
|
|align=center|1
|align=center|0:50
|Nashville, Tennessee, United States
|
|-
| Win
| align=center| 6–0
| Daniel Ynojos
| Submission (armbar)
| Gladiator Challenge: Battle Ready
| 
| align=center| 1
| align=center| 0:50
| El Cajon, California, United States
|
|-
| Win
| align=center| 5–0
| Alex Putolu
| Decision (unanimous)
| Gladiator Challenge: Night of the Champions
| 
| align=center| 3
| align=center| 3:00
| Rancho Mirage, California, United States
|
|-
| Win
| align=center| 4–0 
| Jamiah Willamson
| TKO (punches)
| Gladiator Challenge: Iron Fist
| 
| align=center| 2
| align=center| 0:45
| San Jacinto, California, United States
|
|-
| Win
| align=center| 3–0
| Aquill Stratt
| KO (punch)
| Gladiator Challenge: Nitro
| 
| align=center| 1
| align=center| 1:46
| San Jacinto, California, United States
| 
|-
| Win
| align=center| 2–0
| Arsen Galstyan
| TKO (punches)
| LOP: Chaos at the Casino 3
| 
| align=center| 1
| align=center| 1:45
| Inglewood, California, United States
| 
|-
| Win
| align=center| 1–0
| Ethan Cox
| KO (punch)
| SCMMA 3: Fight to the End
| 
| align=center| 1
| align=center| 2:14
| Ontario, California, United States
|
|-
|}

See also
 List of male mixed martial artists

References

External links 
 
 

Light heavyweight mixed martial artists
American male mixed martial artists
Mixed martial artists from California
Sportspeople from San Bernardino, California
Living people
1987 births
Ultimate Fighting Championship male fighters